The 140th Georgia General Assembly met from January 9, 1989, until January 14, 1991, at the Georgia State Capitol in Atlanta.

Party standings

Senate

House of Representatives 

*Active political parties in Georgia are not limited to the Democratic and Republican parties.  Libertarians, and occasionally others, run candidates in elections.  However, for the 1989-90 session of the General Assembly, only the two major parties were successful in electing legislators to office.

Officers

Senate

Presiding Officer

Majority leadership

Minority leadership

House of Representatives

Presiding Officer

Majority leadership

Minority leadership

Members of the State Senate

Members of the House of Representatives

See also

Georgia Senate
Georgia House of Representatives

External links
Georgia General Assembly website 
 Members of the General Assembly of Georgia, Senate and House of Representatives - First Session of 1989-90 Term
Official Georgia Government Publications - Library - Link to "Picture Book"

Georgia (U.S. state) legislative sessions
1989 in American politics
1990 in American politics
1989 in Georgia (U.S. state)
1990 in Georgia (U.S. state)